Wharton Creek is a stream in the U.S. state of Arkansas.

A variant name was " Creek". The stream was named after Joshua , a pioneer settler.

References

Rivers of Madison County, Arkansas
Rivers of Arkansas